The 1997 Tour de France was the 84th edition of Tour de France, one of cycling's Grand Tours. The Tour began in Rouen with a prologue individual time trial on 5 July and Stage 11 occurred on 16 July with a hilly stage from Andorra Arcalis. The race finished on the Champs-Élysées in Paris on 27 July.

Stage 11
16 July 1997 — Andorra Arcalis to Perpignan,

Stage 12
18 July 1997 — Saint-Étienne,  (ITT)

Stage 13
19 July 1997 — Saint-Étienne to Alpe d'Huez,

Stage 14
20 July 1997 — Le Bourg-d'Oisans to Courchevel,

Stage 15
21 July 1997 — Courchevel to Morzine,

Stage 16
22 July 1997 — Morzine to Fribourg (Switzerland),

Stage 17
23 July 1997 — Fribourg (Switzerland) to Colmar,

Stage 18
24 July 1997 — Colmar to Montbéliard,

Stage 19
25 July 1997 — Montbéliard to Dijon,

Stage 20
26 July 1997 — Disneyland Paris,  (ITT)

Stage 21
27 July 1997 — Disneyland Paris to Paris Champs-Élysées,

Notes

References

1997 Tour de France
Tour de France stages